Christopher Mayne (born 2 November 1988) is a former professional Australian rules footballer who played for the Fremantle Football Club and the Collingwood Football Club in the Australian Football League (AFL). He attended Kent Street Senior High School.

Early career

He was selected by Fremantle with the 40th selection in the 2007 AFL National Draft from the Perth Football Club in the WAFL. He played full forward, forward-pocket and half-forward.

Mayne spent most of the 2006 season recovering from a groin injury and only played four games.  He recovered in 2007, but was now too old to represent WA at the National Under 18s Championships that most potential AFL draft picks attend.

In 2007 he made his debut for Perth in the WAFL and was amongst their best players in his second match. Noticeable on the field with his curly blonde hair, the strong marking forward played eight games for Perth in 2007.

AFL career

In 2008 he made an impressive debut for Fremantle in an exhibition match in South Africa against Carlton, kicking two goals.

At the conclusion of the 2016 AFL season, Mayne joined Collingwood as an unrestricted free agent after playing 172 games and kicking 196 goals for Fremantle since making his debut in 2008.

Mayne retired at the end of the 2021 AFL season.

Statistics
 Statistics are correct to the end of the 2021 season

|-
|- style="background-color: #eaeaea"
! scope="row" style="text-align:center" | 2008
|style="text-align:center;"|
| 23 || 17 || 10 || 8 || 105 || 118 || 223 || 72 || 32 || 0.6 || 0.5 || 6.2 || 6.9 || 13.1 || 4.2 || 1.9 || 0
|-
! scope="row" style="text-align:center" | 2009
|style="text-align:center;"|
| 23 || 5 || 10 || 4 || 27 || 24 || 51 || 20 || 14 || 2.0 || 0.8 || 5.4 || 4.8 || 10.2 || 4.0 || 2.8 || 1
|- style="background-color: #eaeaea"
! scope="row" style="text-align:center" | 2010
|style="text-align:center;"|
| 23 || 14 || 16 || 9 || 75 || 91 || 166 || 61 || 45 || 1.1 || 0.6 || 5.4 || 6.5 || 11.9 || 4.4 || 3.2 || 0
|-
! scope="row" style="text-align:center" | 2011
|style="text-align:center;"|
| 23 || 22 || 25 || 23 || 128 || 137 || 265 || 94 || 92 || 1.1 || 1.0 || 5.8 || 6.2 || 12.0 || 4.3 || 4.2 || 0
|- style="background-color: #eaeaea"
! scope="row" style="text-align:center" | 2012
|style="text-align:center;"|
| 23 || 23 || 39 || 7 || 163 || 158 || 321 || 109 || 83 || 1.7 || 0.3 || 7.1 || 6.9 || 14.0 || 4.7 || 3.6 || 2
|-
! scope="row" style="text-align:center" | 2013
|style="text-align:center;"|
| 23 || 24 || 37 || 12 || 190 || 198 || 388 || 141 || 110 || 1.5 || 0.5 || 7.9 || 8.2 || 16.2 || 5.9 || 4.6 || 2
|- style="background-color: #eaeaea"
! scope="row" style="text-align:center" | 2014
|style="text-align:center;"|
| 23 || 23 || 13 || 11 || 118 || 186 || 304 || 106 || 91 || 0.6 || 0.5 || 5.1 || 8.1 || 13.2 || 4.6 || 4.0 || 0
|-
! scope="row" style="text-align:center" | 2015
|style="text-align:center;"|
| 23 || 22 || 28 || 17 || 136 || 164 || 300 || 107 || 122 || 1.3 || 0.8 || 6.2 || 7.4 || 13.6 || 4.9 || 5.6 || 3
|- style="background-color: #eaeaea"
! scope="row" style="text-align:center" | 2016
|style="text-align:center;"|
| 23 || 22 || 18 || 17 || 142 || 183 || 325 || 109 || 119 || 0.8 || 0.8 || 6.4 || 8.3 || 14.8 || 5.0 || 5.4 || 1
|-
! scope="row" style="text-align:center" | 2017
|style="text-align:center;"|
| 16 || 3 || 2 || 2 || 19 || 17 || 36 || 9 || 14 || 0.7 || 0.7 || 6.3 || 5.7 || 12.0 || 3.0 || 4.7 || 0
|- style="background-color: #eaeaea"
! scope="row" style="text-align:center" | 2018
|style="text-align:center;"|
| 16 || 21 || 5 || 11 || 172 || 188 || 360 || 108 || 84 || 0.2 || 0.5 || 8.2 || 9.0 || 17.1 || 5.1 || 4.0 || 0
|-
! scope="row" style="text-align:center" | 2019
|style="text-align:center;"|
| 16 || 21 || 4 || 2 || 219 || 183 || 402 || 116 || 56 || 0.2 || 0.1 || 10.4 || 8.7 || 19.1 || 5.5 || 2.7 || 0
|- style="background-color: #eaeaea"
! scope="row" style="text-align:center" | 2020
|style="text-align:center;"|
| 16 || 14 || 0 || 2 || 87 || 116 || 203 || 48 || 38 || 0 || 0.1 || 6.2 || 8.3 || 14.5 || 3.4 || 2.7 || 0
|- 
! scope="row" style="text-align:center" | 2021
|style="text-align:center;"|
| 16 || 17 || 0 || 0 || 225 || 179 || 404 || 128 || 44 || 0 || 0 || 13.2 || 10.5 || 23.8 || 7.5 || 2.6 || 0
|- class="sortbottom"
! colspan=3| Career
! 248
! 207
! 125
! 1808
! 1941
! 3749
! 1230
! 944
! 0.8
! 0.5
! 7.3
! 7.8
! 15.1
! 5.0
! 3.8
! 9
|}

References

External links

1988 births
Living people
Fremantle Football Club players
Perth Football Club players
Australian people of English descent
People educated at Kent Street Senior High School
Australian rules footballers from Perth, Western Australia
Collingwood Football Club players